Frankenia hirsuta is a species of plant in the family Frankeniaceae. They have a self-supporting growth form, individuals can grow to 17 cm tall.

Sources

References 

hirsuta
Flora of Malta